Cape Breton South was a federal electoral district in the province of Nova Scotia, Canada, that was represented in the House of Commons of Canada from 1904 to 1911 and from 1925 to 1968.

History

This riding was created in 1903 from Cape Breton riding. It consisted of the southern part of the county of Cape Breton, i.e., the districts of Balls Creek Bateston, Big Pond, Bridgeport, Catalone, Dominion No. 1 and Reserve Mines, Fast Bay (South), Gabarus, Grand Mira, Hillside, Loch Lomond, Louisbourg, Main-à-Dieu, Port Morien, Sydney Forks, Trout Creek, Victoria Mines and Lingan, and the towns of Glace Bay, Louisbourg and Sydney.

It was abolished in 1914 when it was merged into Cape Breton South and Richmond.

It was created again in 1924 from Cape Breton South and Richmond. The new riding consisted of the part of the County of Cape Breton not included in the electoral district of Cape Breton North-Victoria and lying north of a line described as commencing in Mira Bay and following the Mira River and Mira Lake to Marion Bridge, the Mira Road to the Morley Road, the Morley Road to the main road between St. Peters and Sydney, that road to the road leading to East Bay and Gillisville, and that road to the waters of East Bay.

It 1933, it was redefined to consist of the part of the county of Cape Breton contained in the municipal districts of Dominion No. 6 (No. 11), Hillside (No. 3), Lingan (No. 20), Port-Morien (No. 12), Reserve Mines (No. 1) and South Forks (No. 18), and including the city of Sydney and the towns of Glace Bay, New Waterford and Dominion. In 1947, it was redefined to exclude Hillside and South Forks.

The electoral district was abolished in 1966 when it was redistributed into Cape Breton—East Richmond and Cape Breton—The Sydneys ridings.

Members of Parliament

This riding elected the following Members of Parliament:

Election results

Cape Breton South, 1904–1917

Cape Breton South, 1925–1968

See also 

 List of Canadian federal electoral districts
 Past Canadian electoral districts

External links 
 Riding history for Cape Breton South (1903–1914) from the Library of Parliament
 Riding history for Cape Breton South (1924–1966) from the Library of Parliament

Former federal electoral districts of Nova Scotia
Politics of the Cape Breton Regional Municipality